Phrynobatrachus villiersi is a species of frog in the family Phrynobatrachidae. It is found in southeastern Liberia, southern Côte d'Ivoire, and southwestern Ghana. Its natural habitat is tropical primary forest. The eggs are deposited on dried-up puddles just before the rains. It is very common in suitable habitat, but threatened by habitat loss caused by agriculture, logging, and human settlement.

References

villiersi
Taxa named by Jean Marius René Guibé
Amphibians of West Africa
Amphibians described in 1959
Taxonomy articles created by Polbot